Free enterprise is an economic term related to a free market.

Free Enterprise may also refer to:

Transport
 MS Free Enterprise I, a ferry in service with European Ferries between 1962 and 1980
 MS Free Enterprise II, a ferry in service with European Ferries between 1965 and 1982
 MS Free Enterprise III, a ferry in service with European Ferries between 1966 and 1984
 MS Free Enterprise IV, a ferry in service with European Ferries between 1969 and 1987
 MS Free Enterprise V, a ferry in service with European Ferries & P&O Ferries between 1970 and 1993
 MS Free Enterprise VI, a ferry in service with European Ferries & P&O Ferries between 1972 and 1996
 MS Free Enterprise VII, a ferry in service with European Ferries & P&O Ferries between 1973 and 1998
 MS Free Enterprise VIII, a ferry in service with European Ferries & P&O Ferries between 1974 and 1993
 MS Herald of Free Enterprise, a ferry in service with European Ferries from 1980 until she sank in 1987
 MS Pride of Free Enterprise, a ferry in service with European Ferries & P&O Ferries between 1980 and 2001
 MS Spirit of Free Enterprise, a ferry in service with European Ferries & P&O Ferries between 1979 and 2003

Other uses
 Free Enterprise, a newsletter published by the U.S. Chamber of Commerce
 Free Enterprise (film), a 1999 comedy/romance movie starring Eric McCormack and Rafer Weigel
 "Free Enterprise", a song by Rick Ross (featuring John Legend) from Black Market
 Free Enterprise Action Fund, was a mutual fund
 Free Enterprise Fund, a conservative fund-raising organization co-founded by Stephen Moore